The 2018 NBA playoffs was the postseason tournament of the National Basketball Association's 2017–18 season. The playoffs began on April 14, 2018 and ended on June 8 at the conclusion of the 2018 NBA Finals.

Overview

Western Conference
 The Houston Rockets entered the playoffs with their best regular-season record in franchise history and appeared in their sixth consecutive postseason. They also finished with the best record in the NBA.
 The Golden State Warriors entered their sixth consecutive postseason, tying their franchise streak of 6 straight postseason appearances since the league's first six years of existence (1946–47 to 1951–52).
 The San Antonio Spurs entered their 21st consecutive postseason.
 The Minnesota Timberwolves qualified for the playoffs for the first time since 2004 and snapped the league's longest active streak of seasons without a playoff appearance.
 The New Orleans Pelicans qualified for the playoffs for the first time since 2015.

Eastern Conference
 The Toronto Raptors also finished with a franchise record for single-season victories, winning 59 games and finished with the best record in the Eastern Conference.
 The Philadelphia 76ers qualified for the playoffs for the first time since 2012.
 The Miami Heat returned to the NBA playoffs after a one season absence.

First Round
 With their first round sweep of the Portland Trail Blazers, the New Orleans Pelicans won their first playoff series since 2008.
 Game 5 of the Sixers-Heat series was Dwyane Wade’s final NBA postseason game. He would retire the following season.
 In Game 5 of their series against the Utah Jazz, the Oklahoma City Thunder rallied from a 25 point deficit in the second half to win the game 107-99.
 Game 7 between the Boston Celtics and the Milwaukee Bucks ensured a 19th-straight postseason in which at least one Game 7 was played; 1999 was the most recent postseason to not feature a Game 7.
 Game 6 of the Celtics-Bucks series was the last game played at the Bradley Center.
 For the first time in his career, LeBron James was forced to play a Game 7 in the first round of the playoffs, courtesy of the Indiana Pacers’ 121-87 victory over the Cleveland Cavaliers. As of 2023, this remains the Pacers’ most recent postseason victory.

Conference Semifinals
 Game 2 of the Raptors-Cavaliers series was the last game before the Air Canada Centre was renamed to Scotiabank Arena.
 Game 3 of the Raptors-Cavaliers series was extremely notable for LeBron James’ floater to win the game 105-103 for the Cleveland Cavaliers.
 The Toronto Raptors became the first top seeded team to be swept from the Conference Semifinals as well as the first top seed to be swept out of the playoffs since the 2015 Atlanta Hawks (who were, ironically, also swept by the Cleveland Cavaliers).
 With their Game 5 win over the Utah Jazz, the Houston Rockets made the Western Conference Finals for the first time since 2015.

Conference Finals
 For the first time since 1994, the Houston Rockets held home court advantage in the Western Conference Finals.
 Game 6 of the Western Conference Finals was extremely notable for the Golden State Warriors’ second half comeback to beat the Houston Rockets. The Warriors trailed the Rockets by as many as 17 points before coming back to win the game 115-86.
 For the first time since 1979 both Conference Finals series went to a deciding Game 7.
 In both Conference Finals series, the road teams won both Game 7s. In the other two instances in which both Conference Finals series went to a Game 7, the home team won each Conference Finals Game 7 in the 1963 and 1979 Playoffs.
 The Cleveland Cavaliers and Golden State Warriors advanced to their fourth consecutive NBA Finals appearances. This also marked the first time the same two NBA teams met in the NBA Finals four seasons in a row.

NBA Finals
 Game 1 of the NBA Finals was notable for JR Smith’s infamous play that cost the Cleveland Cavaliers the game in the waning moments in regulation (they would lose in Overtime to the Golden State Warriors). LeBron James scored 51 points in the losing effort.
 Game 4 of the 2018 NBA Finals was the last game LeBron James played as a member of the Cleveland Cavaliers.
 This was also the first time a team was swept in the NBA Finals since 2007. Like in 2007, the Cleveland Cavaliers were also the team that got swept in the 2018 NBA Finals.
 The Golden State Warriors won their second consecutive championship, their third in four seasons.

Format

Within each conference, the eight teams with the most wins qualify for the playoffs. The seedings are based on each team's record.

Each conference's bracket is fixed; there is no reseeding. All rounds are best-of-seven series; the team that has four wins advances to the next round. All rounds, including the NBA Finals, are in a 2–2–1–1–1 format. Home court advantage in any round does not necessarily belong to the higher-seeded team, but instead to the team with the better regular season record. If two teams with the same record meet in a round, standard tiebreaker rules are used. The rule for determining home court advantage in the NBA Finals is winning percentage, then head-to-head record, followed by intra-conference record.

Playoff qualifying
On March 7, 2018, the Toronto Raptors became the first team to clinch a playoff spot. On March 30, 2018, the Houston Rockets clinched the Western Conference ending a three-year run by the Golden State Warriors as the top seed. The Rockets clinched the best record in the NBA a day later on March 31, 2018. For the first time since the 1996–97 NBA season, two teams played their last game against each other for the 8th and final spot in the playoffs. The Minnesota Timberwolves defeated the Denver Nuggets 112–106 in overtime to clinch the final playoff seed in the West. This also ended Minnesota's 13-year drought without a playoff appearance having last played in 2003–04 season. For the first time since the 2010–11 NBA season, the Los Angeles Clippers would miss the postseason following a loss to the Denver Nuggets on April 7, 2018. This is the first time since 1960 that none of the teams from New York, Los Angeles, or Chicago made the playoffs. For the first time since 2005, both the Lakers and Clippers missed the playoffs in the same season.

Eastern Conference

Western Conference

Bracket
Teams in bold advanced to the next round. The numbers to the left of each team indicate the team's seeding in its conference, and the numbers to the right indicate the number of games the team won in that round. The division champions are marked by an asterisk. Teams with home court advantage, the higher seeded team, are shown in italics.

First round
Note: Times are EDT (UTC−4) as listed by NBA. If the venue is located in a different time zone, the local time is also given.

Eastern Conference first round

(1) Toronto Raptors vs. (8) Washington Wizards

This was the second playoff meeting between these two teams, with the Wizards winning the first meeting in 2015.

(2) Boston Celtics vs. (7) Milwaukee Bucks

This was the sixth playoff meeting between these two teams, with the Celtics winning four of the first five meetings.

(3) Philadelphia 76ers vs. (6) Miami Heat

With the win, the Sixers won their first playoff series since 2012.

This was the second playoff meeting between these two teams, with the Heat winning the first meeting.

(4) Cleveland Cavaliers vs. (5) Indiana Pacers

LeBron James capped off his heroic Game 5 performance with a game-winning 3 at the buzzer to put the Cavaliers up 3–2 in the series. This was the fourth time James has hit a game-winning buzzer beater in the playoffs.

This was the third playoff meeting between these two teams, with each team winning one series.

Western Conference first round

(1) Houston Rockets vs. (8) Minnesota Timberwolves

This was the second playoff meeting between these two teams, with the Rockets winning the first meeting.

(2) Golden State Warriors vs. (7) San Antonio Spurs

Game 5 is Manu Ginóbili's final NBA game.

This was the fourth playoff meeting between these two teams, with the Warriors winning two of the first three meetings.

(3) Portland Trail Blazers vs. (6) New Orleans Pelicans

The Pelicans completed a sweep of the Trail Blazers for their 1st series win in the playoffs since the 2008 NBA playoffs against the Dallas Mavericks as the New Orleans Hornets.

This was the first playoff meeting between the Trail Blazers and Pelicans.

(4) Oklahoma City Thunder vs. (5) Utah Jazz

The Thunder trailed by as much as 25 points in the 3rd quarter. However, Russell Westbrook and Paul George combined for 47 second-half points to help keep their season alive. The Thunder outscored the Jazz 61-28 since the comeback started with 8:32 left in the 3rd quarter. The 25-point rally was their largest in franchise history and one of the biggest comebacks for a team facing elimination in playoff history.

This was the fifth playoff meeting between the SuperSonics/Thunder franchise and the Jazz, but the first since the Seattle SuperSonics relocated to Oklahoma City and became the Thunder in 2008. The two teams have split their previous four playoff matchups.

Conference semifinals
Note: Times are EDT (UTC−4) as listed by NBA. If the venue is located in a different time zone, the local time is also given.

Eastern Conference semifinals

(1) Toronto Raptors vs. (4) Cleveland Cavaliers

LeBron James capped off a 38-point performance with a fadeaway bank shot floater at the buzzer to lead the Cavs to a commanding 3–0 series lead.

This was the third playoff meeting between these two teams, with Cleveland winning the first two meetings.

(2) Boston Celtics vs. (3) Philadelphia 76ers

This was the 21st playoff meeting between these two teams, with the Celtics winning 12 of the first 20 meetings.

Western Conference semifinals

(1) Houston Rockets vs. (5) Utah Jazz

This was the eighth playoff meeting between these two teams, with the Jazz winning five of the first seven meetings.

(2) Golden State Warriors vs. (6) New Orleans Pelicans

This was the second meeting in the playoffs between the two teams, with the Warriors winning the first meeting.

Conference finals

Note: Times are EDT (UTC−4) as listed by NBA. If the venue is located in a different time zone, the local time is also given.

Eastern Conference finals

(2) Boston Celtics vs. (4) Cleveland Cavaliers

It marked the first time since the 1987–88 season that the Celtics made two consecutive Conference Finals. It was also the Celtics' first home loss of the postseason. Their loss at home after leading 3–2 in the series was the first time that had happened since 2009. This was the fifth time in NBA history that the road team won a Game 7 after the home team had won each of the first six games. LeBron James became the first non-Celtic to advance to 8 consecutive NBA Finals. It was also the second time in the Celtics' history that they had lost a playoff series in which they had taken a 2–0 lead.

This was the eighth playoff meeting between these two teams, with the Celtics winning four of the first seven meetings.

Western Conference finals

(1) Houston Rockets vs. (2) Golden State Warriors

The game was a memorable back-and-forth affair that came down to the wire.  In the final seconds (6.7 seconds to be exact) with the Rockets up 96-94, the Warriors had one last chance to tie or take the lead in the game, Draymond Green however lost his balance and turned the ball over to Eric Gordon who was then fouled and sealed the game making both of his free throws sending Houston within 1 game to their first trip to the NBA Finals since 1995, but it came at a cost however as Chris Paul suffered a "right hamstring injury" in the final minute, he did not play for the rest of the series.

Kevin Durant scored 29 points while Draymond Green had 15 rebounds & Stephen Curry had 6 assists for the Warriors

Eric Gordon scored 24 points while Clint Capela scored 14 rebounds & Chris Paul with 6 assists for the Rockets.
Golden State rallied from a 17-point first quarter deficit by outscoring Houston 64–25 in the second half to force a Game 7. The Rockets' 25 second-half points tied a franchise record low for scoring in any half in the postseason.

The Rockets controlled the 1st half, leading by as much as 15 points, the half ended on a Eric Gordon buzzer-beating layup putting the score at halftime 54-43 in Favor of Houston. However, the game took a drastic change from that point as the Warriors would once again rally and took the lead with 4 minutes left in the 3rd quarter, a lead they never relinquished as they continued to cruise throughout the rest of the game to win their 4th Consecutive Western Conference title.

For The Warriors: Kevin Durant scored 34 points, Draymond Green scored 13 rebounds & Steph Curry scored 10 assists, the Team went 16-of-39 from the 3-point line during the game

For The Rockets: Although James Harden scored 32 points & 6 Assists with P.J. Tucker scoring 12 rebounds. The Rockets missed 27 consecutive 3-pointers, which is a record for most ever missed consecutively in a playoff game, they also went 1-of-30 from the 3-pointer line to close out the game.

This is the Warriors' first game 7 road win since 1948 and the first Western Conference team to win a conference finals game 7 on the road since the 2001–02 Los Angeles Lakers.

This was the third playoff meeting between these two teams, with the Warriors winning the first two meetings.

2018 NBA Finals: (E4) Cleveland Cavaliers vs. (W2) Golden State Warriors

Note: Times are EDT (UTC−4) as listed by NBA. If the venue is located in a different time zone, the local time is also given.

Game 1 would go on to be an instant classic, with LeBron James scoring 51 points. The game was tight throughout, as neither team was able to gain separation. However, the final minutes did not come without controversy as Durant seemingly charged onto James when driving to the basket. The officials reviewed that James was not within the restricted area, and the call was then reversed into a blocking foul, thus allowing Durant to tie the game with a pair of free throws. Eventually, when the Warriors were leading 107-106, James passed the ball that went out of bounds while George Hill was fouled, thus giving him a pair of free throws. After making the first free throw to tie it at 107, he missed the second free throw, which was rebounded by J.R. Smith, who ran the clock as it was perceived that he believed the Cavaliers had the lead. He passed the ball to Hill, whose shot was blocked by Draymond Green at the buzzer. The Warriors dominated overtime 17-7 as they won the series opener 124–114. Stephen Curry, Kevin Durant, and Klay Thompson respectively scored 29, 26, and 24 points. In Game 2, the Warriors blew out the Cavs 122–103 as Curry sinked in 9 three-pointers and finished with 33 points and Durant dropped 26 points. The Warriors sent more double teams on James, holding him to 29 points. As Game 3 shifted to Cleveland, the Cavaliers dominated the first half, leading by as many as 13. Curry and Thompson, the Splash Brothers, had a bad night only combining for only 21 points on 7-27 shooting. However, in the second half, the Warriors fought back, making it a back-and-forth game as Kevin Durant scored 43 points, and made a key clutch shot in the closing minutes that put the Warriors up 106–100, and eventually winning 110–102 to put the Warriors up 3–0 for the second straight year. After a close first half in Game 4, the Warriors dominated the third quarter and routed the Cavaliers 108–85 behind Stephen Curry's 37 points and seven three-pointers, as well as a triple-double by Durant, thus completing the sweep. Durant won Finals MVP for the second straight year behind averages of 28.8 points, 10.8 rebounds and 7.5 assists, while Curry averaged 27.5 points for the series. LeBron James led both teams in scoring and assists, putting up averages of 34.0 points and 10.0 assists in a losing effort.

This was the fourth meeting in the NBA Finals between these two teams, with the Warriors winning two of the first three meetings.

Statistical leaders

Media coverage

Television
ESPN, TNT, ABC, NBA TV , ESPN2, and ESPNews televised the playoffs nationally in the United States. In the first round, regional sports networks affiliated with the teams also broadcast the games, except for games televised on ABC. Throughout the first two rounds, TNT televised games Sunday through Wednesday(2nd round), Thursday (1st round), ESPN televised games Thursday (2nd round)and Friday, and ABC televised selected games on Saturday and Sunday, usually in the afternoon. NBA TV, ESPN2 and ESPNEWS has aired select weekday games in the first round. ESPN/ABC televised the Eastern Conference Finals, while the Western Conference Finals was televised by TNT. ABC had exclusive television rights to the 2018 NBA Finals, which was the 16th consecutive year for the network.

References

External links

Basketball – Reference.com's 2018 Playoffs section

Playoffs
National Basketball Association playoffs
ABS-CBN television specials